Alexander Patrick Holland (19 April 1884 – 28 November 1933) was an Australian rules footballer who played for the Collingwood Football Club and Melbourne Football Club in the Victorian Football League (VFL).

Notes

External links 

Alex Holland on Demonwiki
Alex Holland on Collingwood Forever

1884 births
1933 deaths
Australian rules footballers from Melbourne
Collingwood Football Club players
Melbourne Football Club players